Jesús Nazaret Aicardo Collantes (born 4 December 1988), commonly known as Aicardo, is a Spanish futsal player who plays for Jaen paraíso as a defender.

Honours
UEFA Futsal Champions League third place: 2018–19
UEFA Futsal Champions League champion: 2019-20

References

External links
LNFS profile
RFEF profile
UEFA profile

1988 births
Living people
Sportspeople from Cádiz
Spanish men's futsal players
Santiago Futsal players
FC Barcelona Futsal players